J. T. King (October 22, 1912 – January 27, 1993) was an American football player, coach, and college athletics administrator. He served as the head football coach at Texas Tech University from 1961 to 1969, compiling a record of a 44–45–3. King was the athletic director at Texas Tech from 1970 to 1978.

Born in Wilmot, Arkansas, King graduated from Houston Reagan High School. Collegiately, he played offensive guard under coach Dana X. Bible at Texas. He later served as an assistant coach at his alma mater from 1950 to 1952 and again from 1954 to 1956.

King was appointed head coach at Texas Tech on November 29, 1960, after DeWitt Weaver resigned to enter private business in Alabama.

King was inducted to the University of Texas Men's Athletics Hall of Honor in 1981. He died from cancer, on January 27, 1993, in Lubbock, Texas.

Head coaching record

College

References

External links
 

1912 births
1993 deaths
American football guards
Texas A&M Aggies football coaches
Texas Longhorns football coaches
Texas Longhorns football players
Texas Tech Red Raiders athletic directors
Texas Tech Red Raiders football coaches
Tulane Green Wave football coaches
High school football coaches in Oklahoma
People from Ashley County, Arkansas
Coaches of American football from Texas
Players of American football from Houston
Deaths from cancer in Texas